Plante, Planté or La Plante is a surname. Notable people with the surname include:

Ada May Plante (1875–1950), New Zealand artist
Alex Plante (born 1989), Canadian hockey player
Alicia Plante (born 1939), Spanish writer
Arthur Plante (1869–1927), Canadian lawyer and politician
Bill Plante (1938–2022), American journalist for CBS News
Brian Plante (born 1956), American science fiction writer
Cam Plante (born 1964), Canadian former hockey player
Dan Plante (born 1971), Canadian former National Hockey League player
David Plante (born 1940), American novelist
Derek Plante (born 1971), hockey coach and retired National Hockey League player
Francis Planté (1839–1934), French pianist
Franciscus Plante (1613–1690), Dutch poet
Gaston Planté (1834–1889), French physicist who invented the lead-acid battery
Jacques Plante (1929–1986), Canadian ice hockey goaltender
Jean-François Plante, Canadian politician
Joseph-Bernard Planté (1768–1826), notary and politician in Lower Canada
Laura La Plante (1904–1996), American film actress
Lynda La Plante (born 1943), English author, screenwriter and former actress
Pacifique Plante (died 1976), Canadian corruption-fighting lawyer
Pierre Plante (born 1951), Canadian retired hockey player
Thomas G. Plante, American psychologist
Tyler Plante (born 1987), Canadian hockey player
Vincent Planté (born 1980), French football goalkeeper
Violet La Plante (1908–1984), American film actress; sister of Laura La Plante

See also
Laplante (surname)
Plant (disambiguation), includes a list of people with the surname Plant